Eucosma fulvana is a species of moth, belonging to the genus Eucosma.

It is native to Europe. where it has a limited distribution (from Great Britain , Germany , Estonia and the Nordic countries except Iceland). Julius von Kennel provides a full description. The larvae feed on the flower heads of Centaurea spp.

References

Eucosmini